Bukit Kuamas Forest Reserve is a protected forest reserve in Telupid District of Sandakan Division, Sabah, Malaysia. It was designated as a Class 1 Protection Forest by the Sabah Forestry Department in 1992. The reserve is hilly and surrounded by palm oil plantations. The forest is mixed dipterocarp. Threats to the reserve forests include logging, fires and erosion.

Flora
Bukit Kuamas Forest Reserve hosts threatened tree species such as Aquilaria malaccensis, Dipterocarpus acutangulus, Dipterocarpus confertus and Dipterocarpus lowii. Other species include Parashorea tomentella, Borneodendron aenigmaticum and Dryobalanops lanceolata. The reserve is home to numerous Shorea species.

Fauna
Bukit Kuamas Forest Reserve is home to animals including red leaf monkey, sambar deer and  mouse deer. The butterfly species Trogonoptera brookiana has been observed in the reserve.

References

Forest reserves of Sabah
Telupid District
Borneo lowland rain forests